Reham Yacoub also known as Riham Yaqoob (1991 – 19 August 2020) was an Iraqi human rights advocate and doctor by profession who predominantly campaigned against human rights violations in Iraq and also served as a prominent figure protesting against the Government of Iraq during the Iraq protests since 2018. She also raised her voice and concern regarding youth employment, infrastructure and access to electricity. She was reportedly receiving death threats since 2018 for organising women's marches and ever since participating in the training courses supervised by the United States consulate in Basra.

Assassination 
On 19 August 2020, she was shot dead by unidentified gunmen along the Al Tijari Street in the southern city of Iraq in Basra. Three others were said to have been injured when the gunmen on a motorcycle opened fire on their car while travelling, with the victim Reham Yacoub inside. According to Al Jazeera, the three others injured were all women, and one of them later also died from her injuries.

Her murder showcased a serious major crackdown and growing violence against anti-government activists and protesters in Iraq. She was the second prominent activist from Basra to be assassinated after Tahseen Osama Al-Shahmani and was the third targeted attack by gunmen against anti-governmental activists in a week in Iraq. New waves of protests in Basra were staged by protesters in the wake of the murder of Reham.

Reactions 
The United Nations Assistance Mission for Iraq and Jeanine Hennis-Plasschaert, Special Representative of the Secretary-General for Iraq, condemned and denounced the killing of the activist in an official statement. The UN envoy added that, "the full force of the law must be applied to find, apprehend and hold the perpetrators accountable, and to put an end to this cycle of violence."

See also 
 List of assassinations in Asia

References 

1991 births
2020 deaths
Iraqi activists
Iraqi human rights activists
Place of birth missing
Assassinated activists
Assassinations in Iraq